Swarnamoyee Jogendranath Mahavidyalaya, established in 2014,  is the government aided general degree college in Amdabad, Nandigram, Purba Medinipur district. It offers undergraduate courses in arts. It is affiliated to Vidyasagar University.

About 
The Bhaumik Family of Amdabad was instrumental in founding this college through their generous sacrifice, nobility, and all-out devotion to achieving this goal. Dr. Anindya Kisor Bhaumik, retired Principal and the youngest son of Swarnamoyee and Jogendranath Bhaumik, deserves special mention as he pioneered the establishment of this college in the revered memory of his parents and with the constant co-operation of his eldest brother Sri Amulyaratan Bhaumik, former Headmaster, social worker and freedom fighter; the second son Dr. Probodh Kumar Bhaumik, the former Head of the Department of Anthropology, University of Calcutta; the third son Sri Subodh Kumar Bhaumik, retired Headmaster; the second daughter Smt. Renuka Jana, a retired headmistress, and their sons and daughters. In addition, the donations, bounties, and multiple assistances of the neighboring families are highly appreciated. It must mention that the late Jogendranath Bhaumik, a great educationist, an immensely broad-minded man, and a social worker of great repute, led the way to spread education in backward rural areas by establishing as many as fourteen schools including the well-known Amdabad High School which originated during the British rule in India. To commemorate the memory of this visionary man and his wife Swarnamoyee, an ideal woman and a kind-hearted, affectionate mother, who was also the source of inspiration for all such benevolent activities, this college has been set up with a special view of enlightening this rural territory which had fallen behind in today’s race for progress and development.

Vision 
The vision of this institution is to be an institution with an impeccable reputation for providing quality higher education to the underprivileged youth of rural Bengal. The idea is not merely to create good students, but also competent professionals and independent individuals who would inspire future generations.

Mission 

 To make quality higher education accessible to all, irrespective of their socio-economic status.
 To provide new and innovative forms of learning at par with the global academic scenario.
 To encourage the students to pursue higher education and research in their respective fields.
 To motivate the students in general to manifest their latent talents and ideas, and inculcate ideal habits, a love for learning, and human values. 
 To help the students of the locality grow into responsible citizens of India in the future. 
 To empower the students to cope with the challenges of practical life by providing them with a holistic education.

Departments

Bengali
Botany
Education
English
Geography
History
Philosophy
Physical Education
Political Science 
Sanskrit
Sociology

Course offered

Honours subjects 

 Bengali 
 English 
 Education 
 Geography 
 Sanskrit 
 Sociology

General subjects 

 Bengali
 Botany
 English
 Education
 Geography
 History
 Philosophy 
 Physical Education
 Political Science 
 Physiology
 Sanskrit
 Sociology
 Zoology

Facilities and Resources 

 Library
 Sports facilities
 Social and cultural activities 
 Canteen
 NSS
 Magazine
 Excursion
 Scholarships & stipend

See also

References

External links
Swarnamoyee Jogendranath Mahavidyalaya

Colleges affiliated to Vidyasagar University
Educational institutions established in 2014
Universities and colleges in Purba Medinipur district
2014 establishments in West Bengal